Elliot Kukla is the first openly transgender person to be ordained by the Reform Jewish seminary Hebrew Union College-Jewish Institute of Religion in Los Angeles. Kukla is a rabbi at the Bay Area Jewish Healing Center.

He came out as transgender six months before his ordination in 2006. Later, at the request of a friend of his who was also transgender, he wrote the first blessing sanctifying the sex-change process to be included in the 2007 edition of the Union for Reform Judaism's resource manual for gay, lesbian, bisexual and transgender inclusion called Kulanu.

Kukla has also written for Shm'a: A Journal of Jewish responsibility, Zeek: A Journal of Jewish Thought and Culture and Lilith, and other anthologies.

Before moving to San Francisco, he served congregations in his hometown of Toronto, Ontario, Canada, as well as West Hollywood, California and Lubbock, Texas.

See also
Reuben Zellman

References

LGBT rabbis
American Reform rabbis
Transgender men
Transgender writers
Jewish American writers
Jewish Canadian writers
Canadian Reform rabbis
Writers from Toronto
Hebrew Union College – Jewish Institute of Religion alumni
Living people
Year of birth missing (living people)
Transgender Jews
21st-century American Jews